A product teardown, or simply teardown, is the act of disassembling a product, such that it helps to identify its component parts, chip & system functionality, and component costing information. For products having 'secret' technology, such as the Mikoyan-Gurevich MiG-25, the process may be secret. For others, including consumer electronics, the results are typically disseminated through photographs and component lists so that others can make use of the information without having to disassemble the product themselves. This information is important to designers of semiconductors, displays, batteries, packaging companies, integrated design firms, and semiconductor fabs, and the systems they operate within.

This information can be of interest to hobbyists, but can also be used commercially by the technical community to find out, for example, what semiconductor components are being utilized in consumer electronic products, such as the Wii video game console or Apple's iPhone. Such knowledge can aid understanding of how the product works, including innovative design features, and can facilitate estimating the bill of materials (BOM). The financial community, therefore, has an interest in teardowns, as knowing how a company's products are built can help guide a stock valuation. Manufacturers are often not allowed to announce what components are present in a product due to non-disclosure agreements (NDA). Teardowns can also play a part in evidence of use in court and litigation proceedings where a company's parts may have been used without their permission, counterfeited, or to show where intellectual property or patents might be infringed by another firm's part or system.

Identifying semiconductor components in systems has become more difficult over the past years. The most notable change started with Apple's 8GB iPod nano, which were repackaged with Apple branding. This makes it more difficult to identify the actual device manufacturer and function of the component without performing a 'delid' – removing the outer packaging to analyze the die within it. Typically there are markings on the die inside the package that can lead experienced engineers to see who actually created the device and what functionality it performs in the system.

See also

 iFixit (company known for publishing teardowns of electronics)
 Reverse engineering

References

Technology transfer
Product